The Hanns Eisler Prize was an East-German music award, named after the composer Hanns Eisler. The Hanns Eisler Prize was endowed with 10,000 marks and was one of the most renowned music prizes in the German Democratic Republic.

Statute 
The statutes stated: "The Hanns Eisler Prize shall be awarded for new compositions and musicological works which make outstanding contributions to the socialist musical culture of the GDR". Thus, one or more composers (in the category "composition") and musicology were honoured (from 1971 in the category "scientific papers"). The prize-winning pieces were then premiered in a special concert.

Among the first prize winners in 1968 were Peter Dorn, Gerhard Rosenfeld and Ruth Zechlin. The composers Reinhard Pfundt, Gerhard Rosenfeld and Udo Zimmermann each received two awards. In 1990 and 1991, the prize was awarded by the Deutschlandsender Kultur, most recently to Klaus Martin Kopitz and Hans Tutschku. Since 1993, the  has been awarded by the Hochschule für Musik "Hanns Eisler" to young performers and composers.

Laureates (1968–1991) 
Distinguished by Radio DDR 2:
 1968: Peter Dorn, Gerhard Rosenfeld and Ruth Zechlin
 1969: Siegfried Matthus and Wolfgang Strauß
 1970: Gerhard Rosenfeld
 1971: Jürgen Elsner and Inge Lammel
 1972: Gerhard Tittel, Peter Wicke und Udo Zimmermann
 1973: Friedrich Goldmann, Rainer Kunad, Hans-Joachim Schulze and Udo Zimmermann
 1974: keine Verleihung
 1975: Frank-Volker Eichhorn, Winfried Höntsch and Friedrich Schenker
 1976: Willy Focke
 1977: Manfred Schubert and Manfred Weiss
 1978: Paul-Heinz Dittrich and Thomas Böttger (recognition: Joachim Gruner and Bert Poulheim)
 1979: Manfred Grabs, Peter Herrmann, Bert Poulheim and Gisela Steineckert
 1980: Wilfried Krätzschmar, Günter Neubert and H. Johannes Wallmann
 1981: Thomas Ehricht, Bernd Franke and Heinz Weitzendorf
 1982: Gerd Domhardt and Thomas Hertel
 1983: Rainer Böhm, Reiner Dennewitz and Hans-Peter Jannoch
 1984: Ralf Hoyer, Burkhard Meier, Reinhard Pfundt and Kurt Dietmar Richter
 1985: Günter Mayer (recognition: Reinhard Wolschina and Helmut Zapf)
 1986: Gottfried Glöckner, Fritz Hennenberg and Reinhard Pfundt
 1987: Walter Thomas Heyn and Helmut Zapf
 1988: Reinhard Wolschina and Olav Kröger (recognition: Siegfried Witzmann)
 1989: Johannes Schlecht, Steffen Schleiermacher and Frank Schneider (recognition: Lutz Glandien and Hartmut Wallborn)

Awarded by Deutschlandsender Kultur:
 1990: Christian Münch, Helmut Oehring and Annette Schlünz
 1991: Klaus Martin Kopitz, David Citron and Hans Tutschku

Further reading 
 Erika Tschernig (ed.): Unsere Kultur. DDR-Zeittafel 1945–1987. Dietz Verlag, Berlin 1989, .

References 

Radio awards
German music awards
Orders, decorations, and medals of East Germany
Awards established in 1968